Anna Vajda (born September 3, 1984) is a retired professional basketball player. She is 1.90 m height and plays as power forward.

Vajda is the best player of the Hungary national women's basketball team. 2009–10, she led Hungary back to EuroBasket Women in the qualification campaign, then led MiZo Pécs to the Quarter-Finals of the EuroLeague Women with fantastic numbers (16.4 points and 5.9 rebounds per game). She's the top scorer of the team, the heart and soul of Hungary. But she sprained her ankle badly on 25 April 2010 and her fitness has come into question. The possible loss of this all-around player is a heart breaker for the coach. She can be one of the greatest players in Hungarian women's basketball history if she can remain healthy, which has often been a problem for her. She won 2009-10 Hungarian League with MiZo Pécs and 2010 Turkish Super Cup with Fenerbahçe Istanbul.

Honors
 Hungarian Championship
 Winners (2): 2005–06, 2009–10
 Runner-up (2): 2006–07, 2007–08
 Hungarian Cup
 Winners (3): 2006, 2009, 2010
 Runner-up (2): 2004, 2008
 Turkish Women's Basketball League 
 Runners-up (1): 2015–16
 Turkish Super Cup
 Winner (1): 2010
 Czech Championship
 Winner (1): 2010–11
 Spanish Cup
 Winner (1): 2012–13

References

External links
Player profile at fenerbahce.org
Player profile at fibaeurope.com

1983 births
Living people
Fenerbahçe women's basketball players
Hatay Büyükşehir Belediyesi (women's basketball) players
Hungarian expatriate basketball people in Spain
Hungarian expatriate sportspeople in the Czech Republic
Hungarian expatriate sportspeople in Turkey
Hungarian women's basketball players
Power forwards (basketball)
Basketball players from Budapest